Saiyabuli province (alternate spellings: Xayabuli, Xaignabouri, Xayaboury, Sayabouli, Sayabouri) is a province in northwest Laos. Saiyabuli town is the capital of the province. Saiyabuli is the only Lao province that is completely west of the Mekong River. (Champasak province also has several districts west of the Mekong River including Mounlapamok, Soukama, and Phontong Districts.)

Etymology
The name is derived from the Sanskrit words sena ('army') and puri ('city').

History
In 1904, Siam was forced to cede the area of the province to the French Indochina colony. In 1941, it was annexed by Thailand under the name Lan Chang province, but was returned its pre-war colonial status in 1946. The area is allegedly a heartland for the Laotian military's involvement in the illegal timber trade.

Since the Mekong isolated Sainuyabuli from other Laotian provinces with Hmong villages, the warfare during the Laotian Civil War that affected other Hmong villages largely did not affect Sainyabuli. Most Hmong villages in Sainyabuli did not see any fighting. Houaysouy was a Hmong village in Sainyabuli that had no fighting during the Laotian Civil War, and Vang Pao did not recruit any of its men. After the war, Anne Fadiman, author of The Spirit Catches You and You Fall Down, said that the village was "tossed into the political melee along with the rest of the country." The occupying Vietnamese soldiers regarded the residents of the village as traitors and persecuted them. In 1979 around 400 members of the Lee, Vang, Xiong, and Yang clans attempted to escape from the village. The family of Lia Lee, the subject of The Spirit Catches You and You Fall Down, originated from Houaysouy.

Geography
The province borders Bokeo province and Oudomxai province to the north, Luang Prabang province and Vientiane province to the east, and (from the south clockwise) the Thai provinces Loei, Phitsanulok, Uttaradit, Nan and Phayao.

The province is mountainous with the Luang Prabang Range running roughly in a north–south direction and forming a natural border with the Thai highlands. The flattest and most tropical Laotian area is the floodplain which stretches between the provinces of Sainyabuli and Champasak. There are many mountain peaks with more than 1.000 meters elevation.  Other features include the Pak Kimin ridge near the Nam Heung stream.

Sainyabuli province is home to approximately 75% of the nation's 560 domesticated elephants. They work in the logging industry, which causes a loss in both wild and domestic elephant habitat. The area is little patrolled, which makes the enforcement of conservation measures difficult.

Sainyabuli province is home to the annual Elephant Festival, organised in Hongsa by the Lao National Tourism Authority in partnership with Elefantasia and provincial and district authorities.

Protected areas

The Nam Phouy National Biodiversity Conservation Area (NBCA), a protected area, is home to many wild elephants. The NBCA is in the forested mountains of the Luang Prabang Range close to the border with Thailand and is part of the Luang Prabang montane rain forests ecoregion. The reservoir of lower Nam Phoun Dam is partly within the Nam Phouy NBCA. Elephant monitoring in the Nam Phouy NBCA needs to be improved. In view of the concentration of the largest number of Asian elephants in the province and Laos, the Lao Elephant Conservation Center has been established in Hongsa District. The Nam Phouy NBCA, entirely in the province, is named after Nam Phouy village (or Nam Phoun). Geological formations include Mesozoic sandstones and shales. The habitat is characterized by mixed deciduous forest with an abundance of bamboo resulting from regular forest burning. Afzelia forms at the upper canopy with teak at lower elevations. Apart from wild elephants (about 350), gibbons, gaurs, tigers, dholes, serows, silvered langurs, Asiatic black bears, and Sumatran rhinos are the wild life species reported in the protected area. The protected area was identified by the Government of Laos in the National Elephant Conservation Meeting held in 2008 and WWF has been in the forefront in this effort since 2005. The area is not patrolled much, which makes the enforcement of conservation measures difficult. Elephant monitoring needs to be improved.

The 10,980 hectare Upper Lao Mekong Important Bird Area (IBA) stretches across the provinces of Sainyabuli, Bokeo, and Oudomxai. The topography is characterized by river channel, exposed beds, sandbars, gravel bars, islands, rock outcrops, bush land, and braided streams. Notable avifauna include black-bellied tern (Sterna acuticauda), great cormorant (Phalacrocorax carbo), grey-headed lapwing (Vanellus cinereus), Jerdon's bushchat (Saxicola jerdoni), brown-throated martin (Riparia paludicola), river lapwing (Vanellus duvaucelii), small pratincole (Glareola lactea), and swan goose (Anser cygnoides).

The 18,230 hectare Mekong Channel upstream of Vientiane Important Bird Area (IBA) is an approximately  section of the Mekong Channel upstream of Vientiane city. It is overlaps two provinces: Sainyabuli and Vientiane. Topographical characteristics are braided streams, bushland, gravel bars, open sandy islands, rock outcrops, and sand bars. Recorded avifauna include wire-tailed swallow (Hirundo smithii), small pratincole (Glareola lactea), river lapwing (Vanellus duvaucelii), Jerdon's bush chat (Saxicola jerdoni), and the great thick-knee (Esacus recurvirostris).

Administrative divisions
The province is composed of the following ten districts:

Demographics
The Northern Lao dialect dominates the province. Residents of Hongsa (population 6,000) are predominantly Tai Lue. Other ethnic groups are the Khmu, Tai Dam, Htin, Phai, Kri, and Akha; the Malabri, who reside in the forests of western region of the province, are the last hunter-gatherers in Southeast Asia.

Economy

Sainyabuli province is devoid of vehicle roads except for one north–south route extending from the provincial capital to the Thai border opposite Thailand's Loei province. The province is rich in timber and lignite, and is considered the rice basket of northern Laos, since most other northern provinces are too mountainous to grow enough rice. Other important crops include maize, oranges, cotton, peanuts, sesame, sugarcane and vegetables such as cucumbers, cabbage, and beans.

Landmarks
There are several notable monasteries. Wat Simungkhun in Hongsa features an initiation pavilion and a raised stone platform over a hole "'leading to the end of the world". A lopsided gilded stupa, reclining Buddha, garden, and brick ruins of a c. 14th century sim are near Wat Sibounheuang.

Other landmarks in various districts of the province are: The Tam Hine Cave, Wat Natonoy Temple, Ban Yao Village and Tad Chao Waterfall in Xayabury District; Tad Namyal Waterfall, Tham Phaway Cave, Phangoy, Phakeo and Pha Heua Caves in Phiang District; Tad Namphong Waterfall, Wat Siphoun Temple and Tham Seng Yeun Cave in Kenethao District; Tad Ham, Tad Malou and Tad Fanh Waterfall and Ban Leu Village in Betene District; Tad Itan Waterfall and Ban Tha Xuang Village in Hongsa District; and Wat Xieng Ngeun Temple, That Mat Stupa and Khone, a weaving village Ngeun District. Some of the unique features of these landmarks are the Tai Lue villages where traditional houses are still built with high-sloping roofs, the Tai Lue style temples of Vat Ban Khon which depict rare natural fiber murals and decorations, Vat Si Phan Don known for its diamond-shaped stupa, and French colonial buildings, traditional Lao-style wooden houses can be seen in the Pak Lay town on the banks of the Mekong River, which lies between Vientiane and Sainyabuli.

See also

Thai-Laotian Border War

References

Bibliography

External links

Hongsa Elephant Festival
Map of Laos (physical)
Forest cover in Laos

 
Provinces of Laos